Jack Slade is a 1953 American black-and-white Western film directed by Harold Schuster, written by Warren Douglas and starring Mark Stevens. It was followed by a sequel, The Return of Jack Slade (1955), also directed by Schuster, written by Douglas and starring John Ericson. Both were based on chapter 9 through 11 of Mark Twain's book Roughing It.

Cast

References

External links
 

American black-and-white films
American Western (genre) films
1953 Western (genre) films
1953 films
Films directed by Harold D. Schuster
Films produced by Lindsley Parsons
Films with screenplays by Warren Douglas
Films scored by Paul Dunlap
Films shot in Los Angeles
Films based on works by Mark Twain
Allied Artists films
Associated British Picture Corporation
1950s English-language films
1950s American films